Vaghela may refer to:

 Vaghela dynasty, an Indian dynasty that ruled parts of Gujarat during 1244–1304 CE
 Vaghela clan, clan of Rajputs, also known as Baghel

People:

 Darshna Vaghela, Indian politician
 Fakir Vaghela, Indian politician
 Gautam Vaghela (born 1936), Indian artist
 Gumansinhji Vaghela, Indian politician
 Liladhar Vaghela (born 1935), Indian politician
 Neelu Vaghela (born 1970), Indian actress
 Shankersinh Vaghela (born 1940), Indian politician